Water torch can mean:

Water torch, an oxyhydrogen torch whose gas supply is generated immediately by electrolysis of water
The water plant Typha latifolia, because its stems when soaked in oil make good burning torches

Distinguish from
 A diver's underwater torch (flashlight) (or a magnesium torch in the 1950s and 1960s).
 An oxy-gas torch designed to be used underwater.